HMS Lurcher was a modified , named after the lurcher-type dog, and the fifth ship of the Royal Navy to bear the name; when new she was the fastest ship in the Royal Navy.

Pennant numbers

Construction
The "Firedrake Specials", "Special I class" or "Yarrow Specials" were a little larger than the rest of the class but carried the same armament.

World War I
At the start of World War I Lurcher and Firedrake were assigned to the 8th Submarine Flotilla under the command of Commodore Roger Keyes, and were based at Parkeston Quay, Harwich. Both ships were employed in escorting, towing and exercising with submarines of their flotilla, and the more notable episodes are detailed below:

The Battle of Heligoland Bight

On 26 August 1914 Keyes hoisted his broad pennant in Lurcher, leading Firedrake, two D-class and six E-class submarines eastwards into the North Sea. Also at sea were the destroyers of Commodore Reginald Tyrwhitt. The plan was to place elements of the High Seas Fleet between Royal Navy surface ships and bottomed Royal Navy submarines. Unknown to Keyes and Tyrwhitt, the Admiralty had added significant reinforcements at the last minute.

Keyes' despatch reads: 

Battle was joined at 7:00 on 28 August in misty conditions.

After the German cruiser  was heavily damaged and disabled, Commodore Goodenough ordered his ships to cease firing on her at 12:55 pm and a rescue operation was undertaken. , accompanied by Lurcher and Firedrake, manoeuvred close to Mainz in an effort to recover the surviving crew. Boats from Liverpool were deployed to retrieve those who had abandoned ship while Lurcher positioned alongside Mainz to transfer the crew who remained on board.  By 1:10pm the Royal Navy ships withdrew as the height of tide was high enough to allow larger German Navy units to enter the area. Although the operation had been something of a shambles in the mist, the results were clear: Three German light cruisers and a destroyer sunk against no Royal Navy losses.

Submarines in the Baltic

On 22 September 1914 Firedrake and Lurcher towed the submarines  and  towards the Skagerrak.  This was the first act in a long saga that culminated in a British submarine flotilla in the Baltic.

Raid on Scarborough

By 14 December 1914 the Admiralty had advance warning of the intended raid on Scarborough, Hartlepool and Whitby through signals intelligence. Commodore Keyes was ordered to send eight submarines and his two command destroyers, Firedrake and Lurcher, to take stations off the island of Terschelling to catch the German ships should they turn west into the English Channel. On 16 December, as the situation developed, the submarines were ordered to move to the Heligoland Bight in order to intercept returning German ships. As a last-ditch attempt to catch Rear Admiral Franz Hipper, the Admiralty ordered Keyes to take his two destroyers and attempt to torpedo Hipper as he returned home around 2 am. on 17 December. Keyes himself had considered this and wanted to try, but the message was delayed and failed to reach him until too late.

Search for HM Submarine C31
On 7 January 1915 both Lurcher and Firedrake carried out a search for the missing submarine , to little avail; it transpired later that she had been mined off the Belgian coast on 4 January.

Battle of Jutland

Collision with HM Submarine C17
In May 1917 Lurcher collided with and sank , which was later repaired and returned to service.

Rescue of HM Submarine C25
Their machine-gun attack killed the commanding officer and four other men, as well as mortally wounding the coxswain. The steering gear, compasses and radio were all damaged. The seaplanes carried out further attacks on both submarines between 3:18 and 3:45 pm, and it was not until the arrival of Lurcher that the enemy seaplanes were driven off.

Disposal
Lurcher survived the war and was sold to J. Cashmore of Newport for breaking on 9 June 1921.

Commanding officers

References

External links
 

Acheron-class destroyers of the Royal Navy
Ships built on the River Clyde
1912 ships
World War I destroyers of the United Kingdom
Maritime incidents in 1917